Lenart may refer to:
 Municipality of Lenart, Slovenia
 Lenart v Slovenskih Goricah, the seat of the Municipality of Lenart, Slovenia
 Lenart Regional Gifted Center, United States, school
 Lénárt sphere, an educational model for spherical geometry, 
 AntiCMOS, computer virus first discovered at Lenart, which led to its alias of Lenart.
 Jozef Lenárt, a Slovak politician who served as Prime Minister of Czechoslovakia from 1963 to 1968